The 2006 WNBA season was the tenth for the Phoenix Mercury. The Mercury drafted Cappie Pondexter with the 2nd pick overall in the WNBA Draft. They were close to qualifying for the playoffs, but lost to a tiebreaker to the Houston Comets and the Seattle Storm.

Offseason
Ann Meyers-Drysdale was hired as the Phoenix Mercury general manager.

WNBA Draft

Regular season

Season standings

Season Schedule

Player stats
Note: GP= Games played; FG = Field Goals; MIN= Minutes; REB= Rebounds; AST= Assists; STL = Steals; BLK = Blocks; PTS = Points

Awards and honors
8/14/06: Diana Taurasi, WNBA Player of the Week
7/10/06: Diana Taurasi, WNBA Player of the Week
6/12/06: Cappie Pondexter, WNBA Player of the Week

References

External links 
Mercury on Basketball Reference

Phoenix Mercury seasons
Phoenix
Phoenix Mercury